The thirty-third season of Saturday Night Live, an American sketch comedy series, originally aired in the United States on NBC between September 29, 2007, and May 17, 2008.

History
This season also saw the death of the show's first host, comedian/actor George Carlin. A scheduled rerun of the episode hosted by Elliot Page was replaced with a rerun of the show's first episode, which had Carlin as host and Janis Ian and Billy Preston as musical guests.

Strike
Because of the 2007–08 Writers Guild of America strike, there were only 12 episodes produced in this season instead of the usual 20 (with4 consecutive episodes made between February 23 and March 15), making this the shortest season in the series run and beating out both the sixth (1980–1981) season and the thirteenth (1987–1988) season, which had thirteen episodes and were also cut short due to WGA strikes (the only difference being that the hiatus in season 33 didn't abruptly end the season like it had with seasons6 and 13. In addition, season six was also cut short due to NBC executives putting Saturday Night Live on hiatus for retooling following Jean Doumanian's termination and the hiring of Dick Ebersol to salvage the show). This is also the only season in SNL history not to have a new Christmas episode, since the WGA strike spanned from November 2007 to February 2008.

On November 5, 2007, after the episode hosted by Brian Williams, the Writers Guild of America went on strike. It was announced that SNL would air its next episode on November 10, 2007 (with host Dwayne Johnson and musical guest Amy Winehouse), live on air, with a future episode to follow, featuring Jonah Hill and musical guest Kid Rock. However, on November 7, 2007, the show's official website confirmed that those episodes were canceled and reruns would be seen beginning November 10, and would continue for the duration of the strike. Hill eventually hosted the March 15 episode, with musical guest Mariah Carey (filling in for a flu-stricken Janet Jackson) and Johnson would host next season, with musical guest Ray LaMontagne. Amy Winehouse would never get the chance to be a musical guest, host, or even cameo due to her death in 2011.

During the strike on November 17, 2007, the cast of the show, along with host Michael Cera and musical guest Yo La Tengo performed an "episode" of the show entitled Saturday Night Live - On Strike! at the Upright Citizens Brigade Theatre (co-founded by cast member Amy Poehler) in New York City. Every cast member except for Maya Rudolph appeared, with former cast members Horatio Sanz and Rachel Dratch and musician Norah Jones making cameo appearances.

On February 12, 2008, the strike was announced to be officially over with a 92.5% vote. Production continued on February 18, 2008 for the February 23, 2008 episode, hosted by former SNL cast member Tina Fey with musical guest Carrie Underwood.

Cast
No changes to the cast happened over the summer and everyone from last season returned. During the strike, longtime cast member Maya Rudolph, who had been on the show for eight seasons since 2000, left the show, as she had no further contract with SNL that year. Casey Wilson, a comedian and writer who frequently performed at the Upright Citizens Brigade Theater, was hired in January 2008 to fill the void, but due to the strike, did not appear on SNL until the show returned on February 23, 2008.

Cast roster

Repertory players
Fred Armisen
Will Forte
Bill Hader
Darrell Hammond
Seth Meyers
Amy Poehler
Maya Rudolph (final episode: November 3, 2007)
Andy Samberg
Jason Sudeikis
Kenan Thompson
Kristen Wiig

Featured players
Casey Wilson (first episode: February 23, 2008)

bold denotes Weekend Update anchor

Writers

Future head writer Kent Sublette was hired as a writer this season.

Episodes

Canceled episodes with booked guests

Specials

Notes

References

33
Saturday Night Live in the 2000s
2007 American television seasons
2008 American television seasons
Television shows directed by Don Roy King